Shenzhou 8 was an uncrewed flight of China's Shenzhou program, launched on 31 October 2011 UTC, or 1 November 2011 in China, by a Long March 2F rocket which lifted off from the Jiuquan Satellite Launch Center.

The Shenzhou 8 spacecraft was automatically docked with the Tiangong-1 space module (launched on 29 September 2011) on 3 November 2011 and again on 14 November 2011. This uncrewed docking – China's first – was followed in 2012 with the crewed Shenzhou 9 mission, which performed a crewed docking (also China's first) with the Tiangong-1 module. Only the Soviet Union (Russia), Japan and the European Space Agency (ESA) had achieved automatic rendezvous and docking prior to China's accomplishment.

History 
On 29 September 2008, Zhang Jianqi, vice director of China crewed space engineering, announced in an interview of China Central Television (CCTV) that Tiangong-1, an 8-ton "target vehicle", would be launched in 2010 (now 2011), and that Shenzhou 8, Shenzhou 9 and Shenzhou 10 were all intended to dock with it. On 1 October 2008, Shanghai Space Administration, which participated in the development of Shenzhou 8, stated that they have succeeded in the simulated experiments for the docking of Tiangong-1 and Shenzhou 8.

In February 2009, the launch of Shenzhou 8 was planned for early 2011. By March 2011, the launch had been postponed until in October 2011.

Shenzhou 8 was launched at 21:58 UTC on 31 October 2011 (UTC) (1 November in China) by a Long March 2F rocket. The launch lifted off from 921/SLS-1 Launch Pad at the Southern Launch Site of the Jiuquan Satellite Launch Center. The uncrewed Shenzhou 8 mission successfully docked with Tiangong-1 on 2 November 2011 (UTC), marking China's first orbital docking. Shenzhou 8 undocked from Tiangong-1 on 14 November 2011, before successfully completing a second rendezvous and docking, so as to test the reusability of the docking system. Shenzhou 8 deorbited on 17 November 2011, and landed safely in Siziwang Banner in Inner Mongolia.

Mission 
Shenzhou 8 features an active APAS-like docking module in place of the usual orbital module, and performed its docking operation automatically under ground control. Docking took place on 2 November 2011 at 17:28 UTC, during orbital darkness to avoid interference from the Sun's glare with sensitive navigation and rendezvous equipment. After 12 days being docked, Shenzhou 8 undocked and a second docking took place, this time in full sunlight. The separation, second rendezvous, and docking occurred on 14 November 2011 and was aimed to test accuracy and reliability of equipment and sensors in a bright environment. On 17 November 2011, the capsule was autonomously de-orbited.

The mission also featured a biological sample supplied by Germany and the European Space Agency (ESA), which was cited as an example of "international cooperation in the field of manned space" by Zhang Jianqi, deputy chief commander of the China Manned Space Program.

Spacecraft design 
According to Zhang Bainan, the chief designer of China's spacecraft systems, Shenzhou 8 was the last to see significant modifications from previous models. Future flights will use the same spacecraft design, which is intended for production of multiple units of the same design.

See also 

 Chinese space program
 Tiangong program
 Jiuquan Satellite Launch Center
 Long March 2F

References

External links 

 
 

2011 in China
Shenzhou program
Spacecraft launched in 2011
Spacecraft which reentered in 2011
Tiangong program